Jai Deva Shree Ganesha was a Hindu mythological Marathi TV serial which aired on Star Pravah. The show was launched on the special occasion of Ganeshotsav 2020.

The show was produced by Swastik Productions. It premiered on 22 August 2020 and went off air on 1 September 2020. The show was a limited series with only 11 episodes.

Plot
Eleven episodes, eleven vices and one god to protect us. Vighnaharta Ganesha teaches us the art of living and the way of connecting life with Brahman. The show explains the stories behind the birth of lord Ganesha to the famous curse given to Chandra Dev. The series also shows the famous competition held between lord Kartikeya and Ganesha, and the grandeur wedding ceremony of Vinayaka with goddesses Riddhi and Siddhi.

Cast

Main
 Adwait Kulkarni as lord Ganesha
 Ajinkya Thakur as elder lord Ganesha
 Bhagyashree Mote as Devi Parvati
 Pankaj Vishnu as lord Shiva

Recurring
 Divesh Medge as younger lord Kartikeya
 Rushiraj Pawar as elder lord Kartikeya
 Tushar Kawale as lord Vishnu
 Anuja Choudhary as Devi Lakshmi
 Vedant Ranade as lord Brahma
 Vaidehee Sawant as Devi Saraswati
 Akshay Milind Dandekar as Nandi
 Tanmaya Katvi as lord Indra
 Suhrud Wardekar as lord Chandra
 Aayushree Sangle as Siddhi Devi
 Mayuri Kapadane as elder Siddhi Devi
 Ketki Kulkarni as Riddhi Devi
 Saili Dhurve as elder Riddhi Devi
 Akanksha Pingale as Devi Devasena
 Rutuja Limaye as elder Devasena
 Vipin Borate as Rishi Parashara
 Prayag as Bhringi Maharaj
 Sumedh Mudgalkar as lord Krishna

Production
The series was broadcast during the 11 days of Ganeshotsav 2020. Its producer was Siddharth Kumar Tewary, who was associated with the series Mahabharat and RadhaKrishn. A grand set was made for the series in Umargam. Sumedh Mudgalkar who played the role of lord Krishna in Swastik's famous show RadhaKrishn, reprised his role in this series.

References

External links
 Jai Deva Shree Ganesha at Disney+ Hotstar

Marathi-language television shows
2020 Indian television series debuts
2020 Indian television series endings
Star Pravah original programming
Indian television series about Hindu deities
Swastik Productions television series